The 2021 Anqing stabbing attack was a mass stabbing in which seven people were killed and 13 others wounded in Anqing, China on June 5, 2021. The attack is believed to have been committed by a single attacker. The attacker wielded a knife and indiscriminately stabbed pedestrians in the streets. The suspected perpetrator was identified as 25 years old and unemployed when the stabbings had occurred. His was later identified as Liang Wu, and was sentenced to death on 15 November 2021 on counts of homicide.

The perpetrator reportedly confessed to the crime and was motivated by his family problems, and was a self described pessimist. He apparently viewed his attack as a way to "vent" from his family issues.

References

2021 crimes in China
2021 stabbing attacks
June 2021 crimes in Asia
June 2021 events in China
Mass stabbings in China
Stabbing attacks in 2021
Attacks in China in 2021